The TREMEC TR-3160 is a six-speed RWD manual transmission that features six forward speeds and one reverse speed.  It is manufactured by TREMEC (formerly Transmission Technologies Corporation).

The TR-3160 is designed for either a single or double overdrive application and is used for light delivery vans, light commercial vehicles, or performance vehicle applications.

Based on an 81mm center distance, the TR-3160 utilizes high strength steel on all gears and shafts - maximizing torque capacity and durability while minimizing weight and package size. High capacity tapered bearings and high capacity synchronizers contribute to low shift efforts and shifter travel. All gears are hard-finished.

The multi-rail shift system accommodates direct mount and semi-remote shifter locations that provide greater flexibility while reducing noise, vibration and harshness (NVH).

TR-3160 features:
 Rear-wheel drive, six-speed manual transmission available with single or double overdrive
 Double and triple cone synchronizers feature hybrid and sintered bronze friction material
 Multi-rail shift system accommodates direct mount or semi-remote shifter locations
 High-precision guide plate
 Advanced interlock system
 Anti-friction roller ball detents
 Hollow shafts and webbed gears
 Three-piece end load design aluminum housing
 Low-friction linear shift rail bearings

Applications
 2013–Present Cadillac ATS
 2016–Present Chevrolet Camaro
 2016–2020 Ford Mustang Shelby GT350
 2021-2023 Ford Mustang Mach 1
 2024 Ford Mustang Dark Horse

Selected Gear Ratios

See also
 Tremec

References

6070
General Motors transmissions